Hudson is a rural locality in the Cassowary Coast Region, Queensland, Australia.

History 
The locality was named after selector Gilbert Francis Hudson.

References 

Cassowary Coast Region
Localities in Queensland